Freedom of the Press was an annual report on media independence around the world, published between 1980 and 2017 by US-based non-governmental organization Freedom House. It presented measurements of the level of freedom and editorial independence enjoyed by the press in nations and significant disputed territories around the world.

Methodology
The ratings process involves several dozen analysts (Freedom House staff and consultants) who develop draft ratings using information gathered from professional contacts in a variety of countries, staff and consultant travel, international visitors, the findings of human rights and press freedom organizations, specialists in geographic and geopolitical areas, the reports of governments and multilateral bodies, members of the International Freedom of Expression Exchange (IFEX) network, and a variety of domestic and international news media. Countries are given a total score from 0 (most free) to 100 (least free) on the basis of a set of 23 methodology questions and 109 indicators divided into three broad categories covering the legal, political, and economic environment. Based on the scores, the countries are then classified as "Free" (0 to 30), "Partly Free" (31 to 60), or "Not Free" (61 to 100). The draft ratings are reviewed on an individual and a comparative basis, compared with the previous year's findings, any major proposed numerical shifts or category changes are subject to more intense scrutiny, and assessments are made to ensure comparability and consistency in the findings from country to country, region to region, and year to year. While there is an element of subjectivity inherent in the rating process, it emphasizes intellectual rigor, recognizes cultural differences, diverse national interests, and varying levels of economic development, and attempts to produce balanced and unbiased ratings.

2017 report 
The Freedom of the Press 2017 report covers events that took place between 1 January 2016 and 31 December 2016. It is put on a scale from 0 (most free) to 100 (least free).

Americas

Asia-Pacific

Eastern Europe, Former Soviet Union

Middle East and North Africa

Sub-Saharan Africa

Western Europe

See also
List of freedom indices
Press Freedom Index from Reporters Without Borders

References

External links

Works about human rights
International rankings